Daniel Abraham Gebru (born 11 February 1985) is a Dutch-Eritrean cyclist, who most recently rode for UCI Continental team .

Career
Abraham moved to the Netherlands in 2000 and raced for the Marco Polo Cycling Team between 2010 and 2012. He focused on racing in paralympic events, for which he was eligible because of an underdeveloped leg.

In 2016 he competed for the Netherlands in the Summer Paralympics. Abraham only had a residence permit, but was allowed to compete as a stateless citizen on behalf of the Netherlands in the C4–5 road race. During the race, Abraham was in position to win the bronze medal, but just before the finish the two leaders: Australian Alistair Donohoe and Ukrainian Yegor Dementyev, both crashed, and Abraham took the win. After this, he was decorated as a Knight in the Order of Orange-Nassau. He was issued a Dutch passport on 22 August 2017.

Major results

2016
 1st  C4–5 road race, Summer Paralympics
2017
 1st  C5 Time trial, UCI Para Road World Championships
2018
 1st  C5 Time trial, UCI Para Road World Championships
 UCI Para Track World Championships
3rd  C5 Individual pursuit
3rd  Scratch
 9th Chrono Champenois
 9th Duo Normand
2019
 2nd  C5 Time trial, UCI Para Road World Championships
 UCI Para Track World Championships
3rd  C5 Individual pursuit
3rd  Scratch
2019
 1st Stage 1 Kreiz Breizh Elites (TTT)
2020
 2nd  C5 Scratch, UCI Para Track World Championships
2021
 1st  C5 Time trial, UCI Para Road World Championships

2021 
 1st  C4–5 road race, Summer Paralympics

References

External links

1985 births
Living people
Dutch male cyclists
Eritrean male cyclists
Dutch track cyclists
Paralympic cyclists of the Netherlands
Cyclists at the 2016 Summer Paralympics
Cyclists at the 2020 Summer Paralympics
Eritrean emigrants to the Netherlands